The 2022–23 Missouri Tigers men's basketball team represented the University of Missouri in the 2022–23 NCAA Division I men's basketball season and is led by first-year head coach Dennis Gates. The team plays its home games at Mizzou Arena in Columbia, Missouri as an eleventh-year members of the Southeastern Conference.

Previous season
The Tigers finished the season 12–21, 5–13 in SEC play to finish in 12th place. They defeated Ole Miss in the first round of the SEC tournament before losing to LSU in the second round. 

Following the season, the school fired head coach Cuonzo Martin. On March 22, 2022, the school named Cleveland State head coach Dennis Gates the new head coach of the Tigers.

Offseason

Departures

Incoming transfers

Recruiting classes

2022 recruiting class

2023 recruiting class

Roster

Schedule and results

|-
!colspan=12 style=""| Exhibition

|-
!colspan=12 style=""|Regular Season

|-
!colspan=12 style=""| SEC Tournament

|-
!colspan=12 style=""| NCAA Tournament

Rankings

*Coaches did not release a week 1 poll.

References

Missouri
Missouri Tigers men's basketball seasons
Missouri Tigers men's basketball
Missouri Tigers men's basketball
Missouri